On the Media (OTM) is an hour-long weekly radio program hosted by Brooke Gladstone, covering journalism, technology, and First Amendment issues. It is produced by WNYC in New York City. OTM is first broadcast on Friday evening over WNYC's FM service and is syndicated nationwide to more than 400 other public radio outlets. The program is available by audio stream, MP3 download, and podcast. OTM also publishes a weekly newsletter featuring news on current and past projects as well as relevant links from around the web.

Format 
As defined by former co-host Bob Garfield, On the Media covers "...anything that reaches a large audience—either electronically or otherwise.... Plus, throw into that anything that covers First Amendment issues; anything that has to do with freedom of speech, privacy, is also in our portfolio". The show explores how the media are changing, and their effects on America and the world. Many stories are centered on events of the previous week and how they were covered in the news. These often consist of interviews with reporters about the dilemmas they face in covering controversial issues.

Stories regularly cover such subjects as the use of video news releases, net neutrality, digital broadcast flags, media consolidation, censorship, freedom of the press, the influence of 24-hour cable news television coverage, media oppression, and how the media are changing with technology.

The show also addresses questions about how the media is influenced or spun by politicians, corporations, and interest groups with the intent to shape public opinion. This includes an OTM feature that covers the media's use of terminologies that may engender biased points of view, and the use of hot-button issues and code words, such as "Michael Moore", "torture", "evangelical",  and "islamofascist".

The show also runs a series entitled Breaking News Consumer's Handbook, which offers lists of advice on how to properly report or react to different types of recent events in the news.

History 
On the Media first aired February 7, 1993 on WNYC as a local call-in show, first hosted by Brian Lehrer, then Warren Levinson, and later, by Alex S. Jones. During its first episodes it was called "Inside Media", but the title was changed to avoid confusion with a same-named trade publication. In 1997, the show went national in a magazine-style format, hosted by WNYC host Brian Lehrer. During this period, On the Media was under-resourced, Lehrer had commitments stemming from his own daily show, and On the Media did not have an editor.

In late 2000, Gladstone was brought in by WNYC's director of programming to rethink and relaunch the show. The newly formatted OTM debuted in January 2001, co-hosted by Gladstone and Bob Garfield. In May 2021, Garfield was dismissed for repeated violations of WNYC's anti-bullying policy. Gladstone will continue as the show's sole host.

More than 400 public radio stations currently broadcast the show weekly. The show was distributed by NPR until 2015, when WNYC began self-distributing the show.

Awards 
On the Media won a 2004 Peabody Award for excellence. The judges wrote that "On the Media reminds us that the messenger is always part of the message and must be examined as such". In addition, the show has won Edward R. Murrow Awards for investigative reporting, the National Press Club's Arthur Rowse Award for Press Criticism, and the Bart Richards Award for Media Criticism in both 2012 and 2013. In 2014 and 2015, On the Media won Best Single Story—Radio, Television, Cable or Online Broadcast Media at the Mirror Awards. In 2016, On the Media was awarded the Silver Gavel for its episode "Bench Press". In 2017, producer Meara Sharma was awarded a Gracie Award for her production of the episode "Kidnapped", a special hour on how people around the world get news from Syria.

See also 
 The Media Project

References

External links
 
 The Enduring Allure of the Library of Alexandria - story by Molly Schwartz covering Wikidata and Wikimedia New York City published November 2022

1993 radio programme debuts
Criticism of journalism
Peabody Award-winning radio programs
Radio series about the media
WNYC Studios programs